The 1927 VFL Grand Final was an Australian rules football game contested between the Collingwood Football Club and Richmond Football Club, held at the Melbourne Cricket Ground in Melbourne on 1 October 1927. It was the season's grand final of the Victorian Football League, staged to determine the premiers for the 1927 VFL season.

Background 
Before the 1927 season, Collingwood had last won a premiership in 1919, and had suffered grand finals losses in 1920, 1922, 1925 & 1926. Great dissatisfaction brewed amongst the supporters, and at a meeting at the Collingwood Town Hall in March 1927 the committee was put under enormous pressure to end the seven-year premiership drought. In a remarkable response, the committee sacked the in-form Charlie Tyson as captain and player, and gave the captaincy to Syd Coventry. Coventry went on to win the 1927 Brownlow Medal and the inaugural Copeland Trophy.

In the 1927 home-and-away season Collingwood had won 15 of its 18 matches to finish top of the table, with Richmond next, a game behind. Geelong and Carlton made up the four. In the semi-finals, Richmond had narrowly beaten Carlton, while Collingwood comfortably defeated Geelong by 66 points, and went into the match as favourites.

Right to challenge
This season was played under the amended Argus system. If Richmond had won this match, Collingwood would have had the right to challenge Richmond to a rematch for the premiership on the following weekend, because Collingwood was the minor premier. The winner of that match would then have won the premiership.

Match summary 
Torrential rain and freezing winds before and during the match made for atrocious conditions on the day. While Richmond tried to pick up the ball, Collingwood followed the instructions of coach Jock McHale by "marking on the chest, not out in front" and "kicking the ball off the ground wherever possible". With Syd Coventry impassable in defence, Gordon Coventry booted two goals in the 2nd quarter to take his season tally to 97 and have Collingwood lead by 14 points at half time. Both goals came from mistakes by the Richmond backmen.

In the 3rd quarter, Richmond responded with a fierce attack on the football and the man, with Collingwood's Syd Coventry, Beveridge and Rumney all knocked out in the opening minutes, but the Tigers could not convert the effort into a score, and the Magpies maintained their 14-point margin at 3-quarter time. Richmond's Fincher scored a goal early in the last quarter but the Collingwood defence held, with the Magpies winning by 12 points at the final bell.

The game's aggregate score of 3.20 (38) was the lowest-scoring game in the VFL since Round 6 1900, and is the lowest in any VFL/AFL grand final, the equal 11th lowest-scoring game in VFL/AFL history, and the lowest-scoring game (grand final or otherwise) in the 20th century or the 21st century.

Collingwood's 2.13 (25) is the lowest winning score in a grand final, and Richmond's 1.7 (13) is the lowest score in a grand final.

"The Machine" 
The 1927 flag was Collingwood's sixth premiership victory, and they went on to win the next three grand finals. In winning four premierships in a row, from 1927–1930, they set a record that has not been equalled. The Collingwood teams from that era became known as "The Machine", for the teamwork, efficiency and effectiveness with which they played.

Teams 

 Umpire – Jack McMurray
 Attendance  –  34,551
 Gate  –  £1,779

Statistics

See also
 1927 VFL season

References 

 Atkinson, Graeme: The Complete Book of AFL Finals, 1996.   
 McFarlane, Glenn and Roberts, Michael: The Machine – The Inside Story of  Football's Greatest Team, 2005. 

VFL/AFL Grand Finals
Grand
Collingwood Football Club
Richmond Football Club
October 1927 sports events